Panagiotis Kouroumblis (born 2 October 1951) is a Greek politician of Syriza. On 27 January 2015 he was appointed the Minister for Health and Social Solidarity in the First Cabinet of Alexis Tsipras. On 23 September 2015, he became the Minister of the Interior and Administrative Reconstruction in the Second Cabinet of Alexis Tsipras.

Early life

Blinded at age 10 from the explosion of a German hand-grenade, a remnant of World War II, Kouroumblis took part in a number of student campaigns, and eventually became the leader of a "social uprising" of the blind. He is a founding member of the World Blind Union and worked more generally in the areas of children protection, care for the elderly and people with disabilities.

Political career

In 1996 parliamentary election, Kouroumblis became the first blind Member of the Hellenic Parliament. He was reelected in 2000 and again in 2009. In 2011, he left Panhellenic Socialist Movement (PASOK) to found the anti-austerity Unitary Movement that in 2013 ultimately merged into Syriza.

Following Syriza's victory in the January 2015 legislative election, he was appointed Minister for Health and Social Solidarity, becoming the first disabled person to take any public office at the national government level in Greece.

References

External links
  
 

1951 births
Living people
Blind academics
Blind politicians
Greek blind people
20th-century Greek lawyers
PASOK politicians
Greek MPs 1996–2000
Greek MPs 2000–2004
Greek MPs 2009–2012
Syriza politicians
Greek MPs 2012 (May)
Greek MPs 2012–2014
Greek MPs 2015 (February–August)
Health ministers of Greece
Greek MPs 2015–2019
Ministers of the Interior of Greece
People from Aetolia-Acarnania
Greek MPs 2019–2023